Christopher Jagger (born 19 December 1947) is an English musician. He is the younger brother of rock star Mick Jagger, frontman for the Rolling Stones.

Early life, family and education

Jagger was born into a middle-class family in Dartford, Kent. His father, Basil Fanshawe "Joe" Jagger (13 April 1913 – 11 November 2006), and grandfather, David Ernest Jagger, were both teachers. His mother, Eva Ensley Mary (née Scutts; 6 April 1913 – 18 May 2000), born in New South Wales, Australia, of English descent, was a hairdresser.

Jagger attended secondary school at Eltham College. He won a place to study drama at the University of Manchester, but opted not to go, preferring instead to spend time in London where elder brother Mick was enjoying his first years of fame.

Career
Jagger has worked in many fields, including theatre, cinema, clothes design, and decoration. He designed the jacket with eyes worn by Jimi Hendrix, He first appeared in the musical Hair in Tel Aviv for six months, later with the Black Theatre of Brixton at the ICA in London with Rufus Collins, then joined The Glasgow Citizens' Theatre where he appeared with, amongst others, Kieran Hinds, Pierce Brosnan, and Sian Thomas. He also played repertory theatre in Nottingham, Plymouth, and Hammersmith Lyric London.

In the 1970s, his project for recording an album with the Flying Burrito Brothers was aborted. In the 1980s, he contributed on two of the Rolling Stones' albums Dirty Work (1986) and Steel Wheels (1989) while he also worked in France with Vanessa Paradis's producer, Franck Langolff.

Jagger has worked as a journalist (contributing articles for The Daily Telegraph, The Guardian, The Mail on Sunday, The Independent on Sunday and Rolling Stone), and wrote and presented for BBC Radio 2 a programme about Alexis Korner, a blues pioneer, and co-produced a film for Sky Arts channel, I Got the Blues in Austin.

In England, he also organised charity concerts: one for Bosnia (Bop for Bosnia) and the three others for Tibet including one at Alexandra Palace London in the presence of the Dalai Lama, where the acts included Dave Gilmour and Sinéad O'Connor.

After twenty years, Jagger's third album was released in 1994. Since this date, his musical style has changed to incorporate elements of cajun, zydeco, folk, country, blues, and rock.

Jagger's song "Still Waters" appears on the 2013 Carla Olson album Have Harmony, Will Travel.

Jagger teamed with his brother Mick for two duets to mark the 40th anniversary of his debut album.

In April 2018 it was announced that Jagger would be the support act at six concerts in June 2018 of the German popstar Nena, a long-time fan of the Rolling Stones who had met Jagger during one of his performances in Verden the previous October.

In 2021, he recorded a duet ‘Anyone Seen My Heart’ with his brother Mick and made a video as well.

His song, "Hey Brother" is about his relationship with his brother Mick.

Guitar company
Jagger and his business partner Pat Townshend developed the guitar company Staccato in the mid-1980s. Townshend designed the magnesium alloy guitar, The Staccato. It features a neck and bridge system that could be swapped out.  The user could interchange a bass neck for a six-string neck.  Some models featured no volume or tone pots. The user could activate the volume controls on a touch sensitive LED pad.

A prototype bass was built in Norfolk, England in 1983, and a business partnership was formed to produce Staccato guitars, at the old school house in Woodbastwick, Norfolk. The partners on equal shares were Pat Townshend, Bill Wyman, and Chris and Mick Jagger.  The company went under in 1987. Gene Simmons played a Staccato bass during Kiss' Crazy Nights World Tour.

Personal life
Jagger has been married to former model and actress Kari-Ann Moller for over 40 years and they have five sons between them. The family relocated from North London to Somerset (near) Glastonbury in 2000, and "relish" their country living ethos, they own a flock of sheep.

Through his brother Mick, he also has four nephews and four nieces, among them Jade, Elizabeth and Georgia May; six grandnephews or grandnieces; and three great-grandnieces.

Jagger has described his relationship with his brother Mick as "a two way thing". The deep brotherly ties have resulted in their collaboration musically and artistically, Mick has also helped out with school fees for one of his nephews. In 2021, Jagger penned his 400 page, autobiography, "Talking To Myself" published by BMG Books.

Discography

Albums 

 1973 :	You Know the Name But Not the Face
 1973 :          Chris Jagger (US #186)
 1974 :	The Adventures of Valentine Vox the Ventriloquist
 1994 :	Atcha
 1995 :	Rock the Zydeco (U.S. edition of Atcha)
 1996 :	From Lhasa to Lewisham
 2001 :	Channel Fever
 2006 :	Act of Faith
 2009 :	The Ridge
 2013 :	Concertina Jack
 2014 :	Chris Jagger's Acoustic Roots
 2017 :        All The Best
 2021 :    Mixing up the Medicine

Contributions 

 1976 : Eric Clapton : No Reason to Cry (vocals)
 1997 : Knights of the Blues Table - one track: Racketeer Blues (with Mick Jagger on harmonica)
 2003 : Rick Payne : Sessions - one track: Blue Eyes Crying
 2005 : Edith Lefel : Mèci - one track: L'isine Fémin
 2007 : Whatever Colors You Have in Your Mind (tribute to Bob Dylan) - one track: To be alone with you
 2008 : Flipron : Gravity Calling (vocals)
 2009 : Thank You, Georges! (tribute to Georges Brassens) - one track: First Love (La Première Fille)
 2010 : Mustique Blues Festival - one track: Evil

Filmography

Cinema 
 1972 : Lucifer Rising
 1978 : The Stud
 1979 : Home Before Midnight
 1979 : The Bitch
 1985 : Lifeforce (L'étoile du mal)
 2000 : Attraction
 2009 : I Got the Blues in Austin - Co-producer (Jagger Peyton Films)

Television 
 1979 : BBC2 Playhouse - 1 episode : Standing in for Henry
 1980 : Shoestring - 1 episode : Find the Lady

Bands and musicians

Atcha Acoustic (1996) 
 Chris Jagger: guitar, harmonica
 Charlie Hart: fiddle, accordion
 Ben Waters : piano

Chris Jagger's Atcha! 
 Chris Jagger: guitar, harmonica, washboard
 Charlie Hart: fiddle, accordion, piano, bass, double bass
 Malcolm Mortimore: drums
 Jim Mortimore: bass, guitar, double bass
The first version of the band also included Paul Emile on bass and Jim Mortimore on guitar.

Chris Jagger's Acoustic Trio 
 Chris Jagger : guitar, harmonica
 Elliet Mackrell : fiddle, didgeridoo
 David Hatfield : double bass

Apart from the band members, contributions also came from several artists such as
 Ed Deane
 Dave Stewart (Eurythmics)
 David Gilmour (Pink Floyd) - guitar
 Mick Jagger (The Rolling Stones), Sam Brown - vocals
Steve Laffy has also played drums and percussion with Chris on many occasions.

References

External links 
 The Official Website www.chrisjaggeronline.com
 Jagger Peyton Entertainment
 Chris Jagger YouTube Channel
 

1947 births
Living people
English male singers
English male film actors
English male television actors
English people of Australian descent
Mick Jagger